is a Japanese singer-songwriter and lyricist. Born to jazz saxophonist Hidefumi Toki, she was the lead vocalist for the rock band Cymbals between 1997 and 2003. Following Cymbals' breakup, Toki began her solo career with the release of Standards in 2004 and made her major label debut under Avex's Rhythm Zone with Talkin in 2007. To date, she has released nine original albums and eight cover albums, many of which are performed in both Japanese and English. 

Named the “Queen of City Pop” by publications including Natalie, Toki has been praised for her contemporary interpretation of the genre and her contributions to its revival in the 2010s.

Career 
On February 25, 2004, Toki released her first solo album Standards which was co-produced by her father. It contained covers of songs such as Rodger & Hammerstein's "My Favourite Things" and Earth, Wind and Fire's "September". Her first original album Debut, was released on September 7, 2004 and failed to chart. Additional cover albums Standards on the Sofa and Standards Gift were released on November 10, 2004 and November 9, 2005, respectively.

Following the release of her cover album Weekend Shuffle on December 12, 2006 and its remix album the following week, Toki moved to Avex's Rhythm Zone label. Her first album on the label; Talkin, was released November 21, 2007 to better commercial performance. On January 14, 2009, Toki released her third original album Touch. The album was her first to enter the top 50 on the Oricon Weekly Albums Chart, peaking at no. 33. In October, Toki began hosting Toki Chic Radio on JFN.

Throughout the early 2010s, Toki continued to release a mix of original and cover albums including Ranhansha Girl on May 25, 2010, Cassetteful Days on October 10, 2012, Heartbreakin''' on June 12, 2013, and Bittersweet on July 29, 2015.

On January 25, 2017, Toki released Pink, which was followed by Safari and Passion Blue on May 30, 2018 and October 2, 2019 respectively. The albums were produced by Tomi Yo, who had previously worked with Toki on Heartbreakin' and Bittersweet. In promotional materials for Passion Blue, the albums were referred to by Toki as the "City Pop Trilogy" A remix album of songs from Pink and Safari with collaborators including Tofubeats and Wonk was released on June 26, 2019.

On July 3, 2020 Toki announced the digital single "Home" as the opening theme for Fruits Basket's second season. The single was released on July 7. It was also announced that Toki wrote the song "Pineapple" for boy band V6, released September 20.Home Town, Toki's ninth cover album, was released on February 17, 2021 and included "Home" as a bonus track. The album was preceded by three singles; "Ai", "Jubilee" and "Kaede".

 Personal life 
Toki announced her marriage to a recording engineer through social media on January 12, 2016. The two met during the production of her 2015 album Bittersweet''.

Discography

Albums

Studio albums

Cover albums

Live albums

Remix albums

Compilation albums

Extended plays

Singles

Guest appearances

References

External links
 

1976 births
Japanese women jazz singers
Japanese women pop singers
Living people
Singers from Tokyo
21st-century Japanese singers
21st-century Japanese women singers